Barkheda Nathu is a village in the Bhopal district of Madhya Pradesh, India. It is located in the Huzur tehsil.

In 2013, the Madhya Pradesh government identified 40 acres of land in Barkheda Nathu for the construction of an international cricket stadium, but as of 2015, the construction has not been started yet.

Demographics 

According to the 2011 census of India, Barkheda Nathu has 442 households. The effective literacy rate (i.e. the literacy rate of population excluding children aged 6 and below) is 71.93%.

References 

Villages in Huzur tehsil